The Vanderbilt Theatre was a New York City Broadway theatre, designed by architect Eugene De Rosa for producer Lyle Andrews.  It opened in 1918, located at 148 West 48th Street.  The theatre was demolished in 1954.

History 
The 780-seat theatre hosted the long-running musical Irene from 1919 to 1921.  In the mid-1920s, several Rodgers and Hart musicals played at the theatre.  Andrews lost the theatre during the Great Depression, and in 1931 it was briefly renamed the Tobis to show German films.  The experiment was a failure, and the theatre returned to legitimate use.  No new shows played at the theatre from 1939 until 1953, as it was used as a radio studio, first by NBC, then by ABC, until 1952.  Irving Maidman purchased the theatre and began to produce new shows in 1953, but the theatre was demolished after only a year, being replaced by a 6-story parking garage.

Notable productions
1919: Irene
1926: The Girl Friend
1926: Peggy-Ann
1927: A Connecticut Yankee
1935: Mulatto by Langston Hughes

References

External links

Former Broadway theatres
Demolished theatres in New York City
Demolished buildings and structures in Manhattan
1918 establishments in New York City
1954 disestablishments in New York (state)
Theatres completed in 1918
Buildings and structures demolished in 1954